Selena Royle (November 6, 1904 – April 23, 1983) was an American actress of stage, radio, television and film and later, an author.

Early life and career

Actress
Royle was born in New York City to playwright Edwin Milton Royle and actress Selena Fetter (April 12, 1860 - May 10, 1955). She had an older sister, Josephine Fetter Royle (1901–1992).

Her mother recounted in a newspaper article that she used to take Selena along with her to her rehearsals and performances. One night, then seven-year-old Selena went missing. While the mother frantically searched for her, holding up act two, the audience became restless. The youngster finally turned up - she had gone on stage dressed in her mother's second-act costume; she made a bow, much to the audience's amusement. She later remarked, "And that is the first time I was ever on stage, and I liked it so well I stayed."

Her father wrote the 1921 Broadway play Lancelot and Elaine to provide both her and sister Josephine with their first professional roles, as Guinevere and Elaine respectively. Eventually, she landed a part on her own in the 1923 Theatre Guild production of Peer Gynt, with Joseph Schildkraut, and became a respected Broadway actress. She made one film in the 1930s, Misleading Lady, but otherwise worked on the stage and on radio.

Royle began her radio career in 1926 or 1927 and performed "almost continuously since", according to a 1939 newspaper item.

Her body of work includes playing the title role in Hilda Hope, M.D. She also played Martha Jackson in Woman of Courage, Mrs. Allen in Against the Storm, Joan in The O'Neills, and Mrs. Gardner in Betty and Bob, and appeared in Kate Hopkins, Angel of Mercy.

In the 1940s, she returned to film and had a successful run, mainly playing maternal characters such as the bereaved mother of The Fighting Sullivans (1944), mother to Jane Powell in the big screen adaptation of A Date with Judy (1948) and the title character's mother opposite Ingrid Bergman as Joan of Arc (1948).

HUAC
She made several appearances on early television. However, in 1951, she refused to testify before the House Un-American Activities Committee. She sued the American Legion, which had published Red Channels, in which her name was listed, and won but her acting career ended, her last film  being Murder Is My Beat (1955).

Writer
She also wrote several books, including Guadalajara: as I Know It, Live It, Love It (which went through several editions) and a couple of cookbooks, and some magazine articles. She was the "radio editor" of the short-lived New York periodical Swank.

Personal life and death
During the early Depression, Selena Royle and Elizabeth Beatty started the Actors Free Dinner Club in Union Church on West 48th Street. It was organized so that those who came to volunteer and those who came out of necessity were indistinguishable from each other.

Her first husband was Earle Larrimore, a cousin of actress Laura Hope Crews. They married in 1932 and divorced in 1942. She was married to actor Georges Renavent from 1948 until his death in 1969.

Royle died in Guadalajara, Jalisco, Mexico, on April 23, 1983, aged 78.

Complete filmography

 The Misleading Lady (1932) - Alice Connell
 Stage Door Canteen (1943) - Selena Royle
 The Fighting Sullivans (1944) - Mrs. Alleta Sullivan
 Mrs. Parkington (1944) - Mattie Trounson
 Thirty Seconds Over Tokyo (1944) - Mrs. Reynolds
 This Man's Navy (1945) - Maude Weaver
 Main Street After Dark (1945) - 'Ma' Abby Dibson
 The Harvey Girls (1946) - Miss Bliss
 The Green Years (1946) - Mama Leckie
 Night and Day (1946) - Kate Porter
 Till the End of Time (1946) - Mrs. Kincheloe
 Courage of Lassie (1946) - Mrs. Merrick
 Gallant Journey (1946) - Mrs. Zachary Montgomery
 No Leave, No Love (1946) - Mrs. Hanlon
 The Romance of Rosy Ridge (1947) - Sairy MacBean
 Cass Timberlane (1947) - Louise Wargate
 You Were Meant for Me (1948) - Mrs. Cora Mayhew
 Summer Holiday (1948) - Mrs. Essie Miller
 Smart Woman (1948) - Mrs. Wayne
 A Date with Judy (1948) - Mrs. Dora Foster
 Moonrise (1948) - Aunt Jessie
 Joan of Arc (1948) - Isabelle d'Arc
 Bad Boy (1949) - Judge Florence Prentiss
 My Dream Is Yours (1949) - Freda Hofer
 You're My Everything (1949) - Mrs. Adams
 The Heiress (1949) - Elizabeth Almond
 The Damned Don't Cry (1950) - Patricia Longworth
 The Big Hangover (1950) - Kate Mahoney
 Branded (1950) - Mrs. Lavery
 He Ran All the Way (1951) - Mrs. Dobbs
 Come Fill the Cup (1951) - Mrs. Dolly Copeland
 I Lift Up My Lamp (1952, TV movie) - Cast Member
 Robot Monster (1953) - Mother
 The Good Samaritan (1954, TV movie) - Schoolteacher
 Murder Is My Beat (1955) - Beatrice Abbott

See also
 Hollywood blacklist

References

External links

Selena Fetter (mother of Selena Royle)'s portrait,  University of Louisville archives; accessed May 24, 2018.

1904 births
1983 deaths
Actresses from New York City
American expatriates in Mexico
American film actresses
American radio actresses
American stage actresses
American television actresses
Hollywood blacklist
20th-century American actresses
20th-century American non-fiction writers
20th-century American women writers
American women non-fiction writers